The Braille pattern dots-1236 is a 6-dot braille cell with the bottom right and all left-side dots raised, or an 8-dot braille cell with the top, upper-middle, and lower-middle left dots; and lower-middle right dot raised. It is represented by the Unicode code point U+2827, and in Braille ASCII with V.

Unified Braille

In unified international braille, the braille pattern dots-1236 is used to represent a voiced labial plosive or labio-velar approximant, such as /v/, /β/, or /w/, and otherwise as needed.

Table of unified braille values

Other braille

Plus dots 7 and 8

Related to Braille pattern dots-1236 are Braille patterns 12367, 12368, and 123678, which are used in 8-dot braille systems, such as Gardner-Salinas and Luxembourgish Braille.

Related 8-dot kantenji patterns

In the Japanese kantenji braille, the standard 8-dot Braille patterns 2378, 12378, 23478, and 123478 are the patterns related to Braille pattern dots-1236, since the two additional dots of kantenji patterns 01236, 12367, and 012367 are placed above the base 6-dot cell, instead of below, as in standard 8-dot braille.

Kantenji using braille patterns 2378, 12378, 23478, or 123478

This listing includes kantenji using Braille pattern dots-1236 for all 6349 kanji found in JIS C 6226-1978.

  - 進

Variants and thematic compounds

  -  selector 1 + ひ/辶  =  雍
  -  selector 2 + ひ/辶  =  匕
  -  selector 3 + ひ/辶  =  戌
  -  selector 4 + ひ/辶  =  皮
  -  selector 5 + ひ/辶  =  巴
  -  selector 6 + ひ/辶  =  戍
  -  ひ/辶 + selector 3  =  咸
  -  ひ/辶 + selector 4  =  道
  -  比 + ひ/辶  =  東
  -  selector 6 + selector 6 + ひ/辶  =  柬
  -  数 + ひ/辶  =  戊

Compounds of 進 and 辶

  -  ひ/辶 + ぬ/力  =  辺
  -  ひ/辶 + ぬ/力 + 囗  =  迢
  -  ひ/辶 + ひ/辶 + ぬ/力  =  邊
  -  ひ/辶 + ろ/十  =  辻
  -  ひ/辶 + な/亻  =  込
  -  ひ/辶 + 龸  =  迄
  -  ひ/辶 + さ/阝  =  迎
  -  ひ/辶 + を/貝  =  近
  -  ひ/辶 + ん/止  =  返
  -  ひ/辶 + 日  =  迫
  -  ひ/辶 + 日 + へ/⺩  =  遑
  -  ひ/辶 + の/禾  =  迷
  -  え/訁 + ひ/辶 + の/禾  =  謎
  -  ひ/辶 + ら/月  =  追
  -  き/木 + ひ/辶  =  槌
  -  か/金 + ひ/辶 + ら/月  =  鎚
  -  ひ/辶 + や/疒  =  退
  -  ⺼ + ひ/辶 + や/疒  =  腿
  -  ね/示 + ひ/辶 + や/疒  =  褪
  -  ひ/辶 + け/犬  =  送
  -  か/金 + ひ/辶 + け/犬  =  鎹
  -  ひ/辶 + 宿  =  逃
  -  ひ/辶 + は/辶  =  逆
  -  ひ/辶 + ゐ/幺  =  透
  -  ひ/辶 + す/発  =  逓
  -  ひ/辶 + も/門  =  途
  -  ひ/辶 + ゑ/訁  =  這
  -  ひ/辶 + て/扌  =  逝
  -  ひ/辶 + 数  =  速
  -  ひ/辶 + ほ/方  =  逢
  -  ち/竹 + ひ/辶 + ほ/方  =  篷
  -  ひ/辶 + む/車  =  連
  -  心 + ひ/辶  =  蓮
  -  れ/口 + ひ/辶 + む/車  =  嗹
  -  に/氵 + ひ/辶 + む/車  =  漣
  -  い/糹/#2 + ひ/辶 + む/車  =  縺
  -  か/金 + ひ/辶 + む/車  =  鏈
  -  ひ/辶 + ゆ/彳  =  逮
  -  ち/竹 + ひ/辶 + ゆ/彳  =  靆
  -  ひ/辶 + つ/土  =  週
  -  ひ/辶 + め/目  =  遁
  -  ひ/辶 + と/戸  =  遅
  -  ひ/辶 + ひ/辶 + と/戸  =  遲
  -  ひ/辶 + く/艹  =  遇
  -  ひ/辶 + へ/⺩  =  遍
  -  ひ/辶 + か/金  =  過
  -  ひ/辶 + た/⽥  =  達
  -  て/扌 + ひ/辶 + た/⽥  =  撻
  -  火 + ひ/辶 + た/⽥  =  燵
  -  も/門 + ひ/辶 + た/⽥  =  闥
  -  と/戸 + ひ/辶 + た/⽥  =  韃
  -  ひ/辶 + い/糹/#2  =  違
  -  ひ/辶 + え/訁  =  遠
  -  ひ/辶 + お/頁  =  適
  -  ひ/辶 + そ/馬  =  遭
  -  ひ/辶 + よ/广  =  遮
  -  ひ/辶 + せ/食  =  遵
  -  ひ/辶 + こ/子  =  選
  -  ひ/辶 + き/木  =  遺
  -  ひ/辶 + ま/石  =  避
  -  ひ/辶 + 氷/氵  =  邀
  -  ひ/辶 + る/忄  =  還
  -  日 + ひ/辶 + ひ/辶  =  暹
  -  ひ/辶 + ひ/辶 + す/発  =  遞
  -  ひ/辶 + 宿 + 宿  =  辷
  -  ひ/辶 + 比 + 宿  =  迚
  -  ひ/辶 + 囗 + こ/子  =  迥
  -  ひ/辶 + ぬ/力 + れ/口  =  迦
  -  ひ/辶 + 囗 + め/目  =  迩
  -  ひ/辶 + た/⽥ + selector 4  =  迪
  -  ひ/辶 + ほ/方 + と/戸  =  迯
  -  ひ/辶 + 囗 + れ/口  =  迴
  -  ひ/辶 + 宿 + と/戸  =  迸
  -  ひ/辶 + 宿 + え/訁  =  迹
  -  ひ/辶 + 比 + に/氵  =  迺
  -  ひ/辶 + よ/广 + れ/口  =  逅
  -  ひ/辶 + selector 6 + ほ/方  =  逋
  -  ひ/辶 + そ/馬 + ⺼  =  逍
  -  ひ/辶 + せ/食 + selector 3  =  逎
  -  ひ/辶 + ろ/十 + に/氵  =  逑
  -  ひ/辶 + 宿 + け/犬  =  逕
  -  ひ/辶 + 宿 + 火  =  逖
  -  ひ/辶 + selector 5 + と/戸  =  逗
  -  ひ/辶 + れ/口 + へ/⺩  =  逞
  -  ひ/辶 + う/宀/#3 + む/車  =  逡
  -  ひ/辶 + た/⽥ + selector 1  =  逧
  -  ひ/辶 + 龸 + む/車  =  逵
  -  ひ/辶 + の/禾 + ふ/女  =  逶
  -  ひ/辶 + 宿 + た/⽥  =  逹
  -  ひ/辶 + 宿 + ふ/女  =  逼
  -  ひ/辶 + 宿 + ゆ/彳  =  逾
  -  ひ/辶 + を/貝 + と/戸  =  遉
  -  ひ/辶 + 宿 + 氷/氵  =  遏
  -  ひ/辶 + 宿 + の/禾  =  遐
  -  ひ/辶 + せ/食 + selector 6  =  遒
  -  ひ/辶 + 比 + み/耳  =  遖
  -  ひ/辶 + selector 3 + む/車  =  遘
  -  ひ/辶 + こ/子 + ゐ/幺  =  遜
  -  ひ/辶 + ら/月 + は/辶  =  遡
  -  ひ/辶 + 宿 + か/金  =  遥
  -  ひ/辶 + selector 3 + ほ/方  =  遨
  -  ひ/辶 + そ/馬 + selector 3  =  遯
  -  ひ/辶 + 宿 + つ/土  =  遶
  -  ひ/辶 + 宿 + ろ/十  =  遼
  -  ひ/辶 + す/発 + そ/馬  =  遽
  -  ひ/辶 + 囗 + そ/馬  =  邂
  -  ひ/辶 + う/宀/#3 + り/分  =  邃
  -  ひ/辶 + 宿 + 囗  =  邇
  -  ひ/辶 + 宿 + ぬ/力  =  邉
  -  ひ/辶 + す/発 + い/糹/#2  =  邏

Compounds of 雍

  -  て/扌 + ひ/辶  =  擁
  -  つ/土 + 宿 + ひ/辶  =  壅
  -  ひ/辶 + selector 6 + か/金  =  甕

Compounds of 匕

  -  れ/口 + ひ/辶  =  叱
  -  日 + 宿 + ひ/辶  =  匙
  -  ひ/辶 + 日 + selector 1  =  皀
  -  ひ/辶 + ん/止 + の/禾  =  齔
  -  う/宀/#3 + 宿 + ひ/辶  =  它
  -  仁/亻 + ひ/辶  =  佗
  -  む/車 + ひ/辶  =  蛇
  -  き/木 + 宿 + ひ/辶  =  柁
  -  に/氵 + 宿 + ひ/辶  =  沱
  -  ふ/女 + 宿 + ひ/辶  =  舵
  -  え/訁 + 宿 + ひ/辶  =  詑
  -  か/金 + 宿 + ひ/辶  =  鉈
  -  さ/阝 + 宿 + ひ/辶  =  陀
  -  そ/馬 + 宿 + ひ/辶  =  駝
  -  ひ/辶 + 龸 + せ/食  =  鴕

Compounds of 戌, 戍, 咸, and 戊

  -  す/発 + ひ/辶  =  蔑
  -  ね/示 + す/発 + ひ/辶  =  襪
  -  と/戸 + す/発 + ひ/辶  =  韈
  -  ひ/辶 + 心  =  感
  -  る/忄 + ひ/辶  =  憾
  -  て/扌 + ひ/辶 + 心  =  撼
  -  む/車 + ひ/辶 + 心  =  轗
  -  ひ/辶 + に/氵  =  減
  -  れ/口 + ひ/辶 + selector 3  =  喊
  -  ち/竹 + ひ/辶 + selector 3  =  箴
  -  い/糹/#2 + ひ/辶 + selector 3  =  緘
  -  か/金 + ひ/辶 + selector 3  =  鍼
  -  せ/食 + ひ/辶 + selector 3  =  鰔
  -  ん/止 + ひ/辶 + selector 3  =  鹹
  -  龸 + ひ/辶  =  戉
  -  か/金 + 龸 + ひ/辶  =  鉞
  -  は/辶 + ひ/辶  =  越
  -  せ/食 + ひ/辶  =  成
  -  つ/土 + ひ/辶  =  城
  -  え/訁 + ひ/辶  =  誠
  -  日 + せ/食 + ひ/辶  =  晟
  -  ち/竹 + せ/食 + ひ/辶  =  筬
  -  ん/止 + ひ/辶  =  歳
  -  く/艹 + ひ/辶  =  茂
  -  ひ/辶 + ふ/女  =  威
  -  い/糹/#2 + ひ/辶 + ふ/女  =  縅
  -  せ/食 + ひ/辶 + ふ/女  =  鰄
  -  ひ/辶 + う/宀/#3  =  戚
  -  ひ/辶 + み/耳  =  蹙
  -  心 + ひ/辶 + う/宀/#3  =  槭
  -  ひ/辶 + 火  =  滅

Compounds of 皮

  -  ふ/女 + ひ/辶  =  婆
  -  ゆ/彳 + ひ/辶  =  彼
  -  に/氵 + ひ/辶  =  波
  -  ま/石 + に/氵 + ひ/辶  =  碆
  -  心 + に/氵 + ひ/辶  =  菠
  -  や/疒 + ひ/辶  =  疲
  -  ま/石 + ひ/辶  =  破
  -  ね/示 + ひ/辶  =  被
  -  み/耳 + ひ/辶  =  跛
  -  お/頁 + ひ/辶  =  頗
  -  つ/土 + selector 4 + ひ/辶  =  坡
  -  て/扌 + selector 4 + ひ/辶  =  披
  -  へ/⺩ + selector 4 + ひ/辶  =  玻
  -  む/車 + selector 4 + ひ/辶  =  皴
  -  宿 + selector 4 + ひ/辶  =  皸
  -  も/門 + selector 4 + ひ/辶  =  皺
  -  ち/竹 + selector 4 + ひ/辶  =  簸
  -  さ/阝 + selector 4 + ひ/辶  =  陂
  -  と/戸 + selector 4 + ひ/辶  =  鞁
  -  ひ/辶 + も/門 + selector 2  =  皰
  -  ひ/辶 + 宿 + む/車  =  皹

Compounds of 巴

  -  ⺼ + ひ/辶  =  肥
  -  囗 + ひ/辶  =  邑
  -  よ/广 + 囗 + ひ/辶  =  廱
  -  る/忄 + 囗 + ひ/辶  =  悒
  -  と/戸 + 囗 + ひ/辶  =  扈
  -  に/氵 + 囗 + ひ/辶  =  滬
  -  や/疒 + 囗 + ひ/辶  =  癰
  -  ち/竹 + selector 5 + ひ/辶  =  笆
  -  よ/广 + 宿 + ひ/辶  =  巵
  -  て/扌 + 宿 + ひ/辶  =  把
  -  心 + 龸 + ひ/辶  =  杷
  -  ひ/辶 + ⺼ + つ/土  =  爬
  -  へ/⺩ + 宿 + ひ/辶  =  琶
  -  こ/子 + 宿 + ひ/辶  =  耙
  -  心 + 宿 + ひ/辶  =  芭

Compounds of 道

  -  ひ/辶 + し/巿  =  導
  -  ひ/辶 + 数 + お/頁  =  馗

Compounds of 東 and 柬

  -  氷/氵 + ひ/辶  =  凍
  -  も/門 + ひ/辶  =  欄
  -  に/氵 + も/門 + ひ/辶  =  瀾
  -  火 + も/門 + ひ/辶  =  爛
  -  ね/示 + も/門 + ひ/辶  =  襴
  -  火 + ひ/辶  =  煉
  -  い/糹/#2 + ひ/辶  =  練
  -  ゑ/訁 + ひ/辶  =  諌
  -  か/金 + ひ/辶  =  錬
  -  さ/阝 + ひ/辶  =  陳
  -  て/扌 + 比 + ひ/辶  =  揀
  -  き/木 + 比 + ひ/辶  =  棟
  -  心 + 比 + ひ/辶  =  楝
  -  ゑ/訁 + 比 + ひ/辶  =  諫
  -  せ/食 + 比 + ひ/辶  =  鰊
  -  も/門 + 宿 + ひ/辶  =  闌
  -  ひ/辶 + う/宀/#3 + せ/食  =  鶇
  -  ひ/辶 + せ/食 + selector 1  =  鶫

Other compounds

  -  な/亻 + ひ/辶  =  備
  -  る/忄 + な/亻 + ひ/辶  =  憊
  -  の/禾 + 宿 + ひ/辶  =  糒
  -  と/戸 + 宿 + ひ/辶  =  鞴
  -  日 + ひ/辶  =  晋
  -  日 + 日 + ひ/辶  =  晉
  -  い/糹/#2 + 日 + ひ/辶  =  縉
  -  ゐ/幺 + ひ/辶  =  紐
  -  そ/馬 + ひ/辶  =  豹
  -  ろ/十 + ひ/辶  =  飛
  -  ひ/辶 + 宿 + せ/食  =  鶸

Notes

Braille patterns